The 2002 Tennis Masters Cup was a men's tennis tournament played on indoor hard courts. It was the 33rd edition of the year-end singles championships and was part of the 2002 ATP Tour. It took place at the Shanghai New International Expo Center in Shanghai, China from 12 November through 18 November 2002. No doubles competition was held. First-seeded Lleyton Hewitt won the title.

Champions

Singles

 Lleyton Hewitt defeated  Juan Carlos Ferrero 7–5, 7–5, 2–6, 2–6, 6–4
 It was Hewitt's 5th title of the year and the 19th of his career. It was his 2nd consecutive year-end championships title.

References

External links
 Official website

 
Tennis Masters Cup
ATP Finals
Tennis tournaments in China
Sports competitions in Shanghai
2002 in Chinese tennis